BK Gulbenes Buki, formerly known as ASK/Buki, is a Latvian basketball team participating in the Latvian Basketball League second division.

Achievements
Best achievements in the domestic league:
3rd place in 1998–99 season
3rd place in 2000–01 season
3rd place in 2001–02 season
3rd place in 2002–03 season
2nd place in 2005–06 season

Notable former players 
 Agris Galvanovskis
 Mārtiņš Skirmants
 Ivars Timermanis
 Kaspars Cipruss
 Kristaps Purnis
 Pāvels Veselovs
 Raimonds Gabrāns
 Ingus Bankevics

Bk Gulbenes Buki
Basketball teams in Latvia